The 1912 Kentucky State College Wildcats football team represented Kentucky State College—now known as the University of Kentucky—during the 1912 Southern Intercollegiate Athletic Association football season. Led by Edwin Sweetland in his third and final season as head coach, the Wildcats compiled an overall record of 7–2 with a mark of 1–0 in SIAA play. Sweetland fired his assistant coach, Richard S. Webb, after Webb took several team members to a Knoxville red-light district after the game against Tennessee.

Schedule

References

Kentucky State College
Kentucky Wildcats football seasons
Kentucky State College Wildcats football